ROCK1 is a protein serine/threonine kinase also known as rho-associated, coiled-coil-containing protein kinase 1. Other common names are ROKβ and P160ROCK. ROCK1 is a major downstream effecter of the small GTPase RhoA and is a regulator of the actomyosin cytoskeleton which promotes contractile force generation. ROCK1 plays a role in cancer and in particular cell motility, metastasis, and angiogenesis.

Gene and expression 

ROCK1 is also the name of the gene that encodes the protein ROCK1, a serine/threonine kinase. ROCK1 is activated when bound to the GTP-bound form of RhoA. The human ROCK1 gene is located on human chromosome 18 with specific location of 18q11.1. The location of the base pair starts at 18,529,703 and ends at 18,691,812 bp and translates into 1354 amino acids.

ROCK1 has a ubiquitous tissue distribution, but subcellularly it is thought to colocalize with the centrosomes. This is consistent with its function as a key modulator of cell motility, tumor cell invasion, and actin cytoskeleton organization. In rats, ROCK1 is expressed in the lung, liver, spleen, kidney, and testis.

Structure and regulation 

The ROCK1 structure is a serine/threonine kinase with molecular weight of 158 kDa. It is a homodimer composed of a catalytic kinase domain (residues76-338) located at the amino or N-terminus of the protein, a coiled-coil region (residues 425-1100) containing the Rho-binding domain, and a pleckstrin-homology domain (residues 1118-1317) with a cysteine-rich domain. When a substrate is absent, ROCK1 is an autoinhibited loop structure. Enzyme activity of ROCK1 is inhibited when the pleckstrin-homology and Rho-binding domains in the C-terminus independently bind to the N-terminus kinase domain. When a substrate such as GTP-bound RhoA binds to the Rho-binding region of the coiled-coil domain, the interactions between the N-terminus and the C-terminus are disrupted, thus activating the protein. Cleavage of the C-terminal inhibitory domain by caspase-3 during apoptosis can also activate the kinase.

This view of autoinhibition released by RhoA binding has been challenged by low resolution electron microscopy data showing ROCK to be a constitutive linear dimer 120 nm in length. According to this new data ROCK does not need to be activated by RhoA or phosphorylation because it is always active, and whether ROCK will phosphorylate its substrates (e.g. myosin regulatory light chain) depends only on their subcellular localization.

There is one other isoform of ROCK known as ROCK2. ROCK2 is located at 2p24 and is highly homologous with ROCK1 with an overall amino acid sequence identity of 65%. The identity in the Rho-binding domain is 58% and approximately 92% in the kinase domain. The ROCK isoforms are encoded by two different identified genes and are ubiquitously expressed.

GTPase-RhoA binding can increase the activity of ROCK1 by 1.5-2-fold. Without RhoA binding, lipids such as arachidonic acid or sphingosine phosphorylcholine can increase ROCK1 activity 5- to 6-fold. These two lipids interact with the pleckstrin-homology domain, thus disrupting its ability to inhibit ROCK1. G-protein RhoE binds to the N-terminus of ROCK1 and inhibits its activity by preventing RhoA binding. Small G-proteins, Gem and Rad, have been shown to bind and inhibit ROCK1 function, but their mechanism of action is unclear.

Substrates and interactions 

ROCK1 phosphorylation sites are at RXXS/T or RXS/T. More than 15 ROCK1 substrates have been identified and activation from these substrates  most often leads to actin filament formation and cytoskeleton rearrangements.
MYPT-1 is involved in a pathway for smooth muscle contraction. When ROCK1 is activated by binding of GTPase RhoA it produces multiple signaling cascades. For example, RhoA is one of the downstream signaling cascades activated by vascular endothelial growth factor (VEGF). ROCK1 acts as a negative regulator of VEGF endothelial cell activation and angiogenesis. ROCK1 activation by RhoA also promotes stabilization of F-actin, phosphorylation of regulatory myosin light chain (MLC) and an increase in contractility, which plays a crucial role in tumor cell migration and metastasis. This activated ROCK1 also activates LIM kinase, which, phosphorylates cofilin, inhibiting its actin-depolymerizing activity. This depolymerization results in stabilization of actin filaments and decreased branching which promotes contraction.

Cardiac troponin is another ROCK1 substrate that upon phosphorylation causes reduction in tension in cardiac myocytes. ROCK1 also acts as a suppressor of inflammatory cell migration by regulating PTEN phosphorylation and stability.

Function 

ROCK1 has a diverse range of functions in the body. It is a key regulator of actin-myosin contraction, stability, and cell polarity. These contribute to many progresses such as regulation of morphology, gene transcription, proliferation, differentiation, apoptosis and oncogenic transformation. Other functions involve smooth muscle contraction, actin cytoskeleton organization, stress fiber and focal adhesion formation, neurite retraction, cell adhesion and motility. These functions are activated by phosphorylation of DAPK3, GFAP, LIMK1, LIMK2, MYL9/MLC2, PFN1 and PPP1R12A.
Additionally, ROCK1 phosphorylates FHOD1 and acts synergistically with it to promote SRC-dependent non-apoptotic plasma membrane blebbing. It is also required for centrosome positioning and centrosome-dependent exit from mitosis.

Interactions 

ROCK1 has been shown to interact with:

 LIMK1,
 MLC,
 MYPT1,
 PFN2, and
 RHOA.

Clinical significance 

In humans, the main function of ROCK1 is actomyosin contractility. As mentioned before, this contributes to many proximal progresses such as regulation of morphology, motility, and cell–cell and cell–matrix adhesion. In addition, ROCK kinases influence more distal cellular processes including gene transcription, proliferation, differentiation, apoptosis and oncogenic transformation. Given this diverse range of functions, it is not surprising that ROCK1 has been implicated in numerous aspects of cancer.

Role in cancer 

Recent studies have explored the role of ROCK1 in cancer with particular attention focused on cell motility, metastasis, and angiogenesis. Rho GTPases such as RhoA are highly involved in morphologic changes in cells. When a tumor progresses from invasive to metastatic form it requires that they undergo these dramatic morphologic changes. Therefore, increased expression of RhoA and its downstream effector ROCK1 is often observed in human cancers. These cancers are typically more invasive and metastatic phenotypes.

Angiogenesis 

Increased expression of RhoA and ROCK1 in endothelial cell migration pathways can cause an increase in angiogenesis and metastatic behavior in tumor cells. It has been suggested that ROCK1 either regulates the expression of angiogenic factors or ROCK1 activation facilitates angiogenesis by increasing the plasticity of the tumor. By reducing the strength of cell-cell interactions and aiding the movement of tumor cells, ROCK1 may enable endothelial cells to penetrate the tumor mass more easily.

Breast cancer 

Overexpression of ROCK1 and RhoA is often seen in breast cancer. Activated ROCK1 phosphorylates MLC involved in actin-myosin contractility. RhoA also activates focal adhesion kinase activity. Together, these two pathways create the motile and invasive phenotype of cancer cells. Breast cancers often contain regions of reduced O2 which increases the activity of hypoxia-inducible factors (HIFs). HIFs have been shown to activate transcription of RhoA and ROCK1 leading to cytoskeletal changes that underlie the invasive cancer cell phenotype.

ROCK1 inhibitors in cancer therapy 

ROCK1 inhibitors might be used in cancer therapy for:
targeting of stromal rather than tumor cells
concomitant blocking of ROCK and proteasome activity in K‐Ras‐driven lung cancers 
treating haematological malignancies such as chronic myelogenous leukemia (CML)

ROCK1 inhibition for cancer treatment has not been approved for standard therapy use. Y27632 and Fasudil are examples of ROCK1 inhibitors. Both inhibit ROCK1 by competing with ATP for the kinase activation site. Experiments with Y27632 show it is a promising candidate as a therapeutic antihypertensive agent. Fasudil has been used to characterize the role of ROCK1 in vascular function in clinical studies and has been approved for use in Japan for treatment of cerebral vasospasm following subarachnoid hemorrhage.

Other diseases 

The ROCK1 signaling plays an important role in many diseases including diabetes, neurodegenerative diseases such as Parkinson's disease and amyotrophic lateral sclerosis (ALS), and pulmonary hypertension.

See also 
 Rho kinase

References

Further reading

External links 
ROCK1 Info with links in the Cell Migration Gateway 

EC 2.7.11